Evelyn Parish, on the Paroo River, is a remote civil Parish, of Thoulcanna County, a cadasteral division of New South Wales.

The topography is the flat and arid with a Köppen climate classification of BSh (Hot semi arid) and the economy is based on broad acre agriculture, mainly Cattle, and sheep. There are no towns in the parish and Evelyn Parish is midway between Hungerford, Queensland and Wanaaring, New South Wales to the south.

The parish is on the traditional lands of the Barundji people.

See also
Thoulcanna County#Parishes within this county

References

Localities in New South Wales
Geography of New South Wales
Populated places in New South Wales
Far West (New South Wales)